, also known as Doraemon, Nobita and the Steel Troops New Age, is a 2011 Japanese animated science fiction  action-adventure film based on the seventh volume of the Doraemon Long Stories series, Nobita and the Steel Troops and the 31st movie in the Doraemon franchise. It was released in Japan on March 5, 2011. The film is a remake of the 1986 Doraemon movie, Doraemon: Nobita and the Steel Troops, and it is the first Doraemon film ever to be released in 3D. This movie was ranked the 5th highest earning Japanese animated anime movie.

Plot 
Nobita throws a temper tantrum as he wants a large RC toy robot in order to upstage the rich friend Suneo, who has been showing off the new robot that his cousin made. His fit makes Doraemon angry and he uses his Anywhere Door to get anyway from the summer heat cool off at the North Pole. Sometime later, Nobita follows and a discovers a strange bowling ball-like orb which starts blinking with a pulsating light, and summons what looks like a giant robot's foot. After Nobita uses the foot to sled down, crashing into his room through the Anywhere Door, the bowling ball follows him home through the door and another robot piece falls into his backyard. 

Doraemon follows soon after and admits that he has nothing to do with the robot parts, as the two use the Opposite World Entrance Oil and the Roll-Up Fishing Hole to enter the World Inside the Mirror, an alternate mirror world without people. There, they built the robot which Nobita christens the name "Zanda Claus" as he believed the sphere summoning the parts is from Santa Claus. Using a brain wave controller that Doraemon pulls out of his pocket, Nobita has the robot perform gymnastic maneuvers in a mirror world before bringing Shizuka to join the fun. The trio enjoy with Zanda Claus. However, Shizuka accidentally presses a button on the control panel that makes the robot fire a huge laser beam that destroys a whole skyscraper. 

The group realizes just how dangerous Zanda Claus really is, and they decide to return to the real world and forget about ever having found the robot. However, Nobita forgot about the sphere that has been sending telepathic messages to a mysterious girl named Riruru. The actual owner of Zanda Claus, Riruru seeks out Nobita when he accidentally lets slip all that he knows about the robot. After Riruru proceeds to force him into showing her where it is, Nobita borrows the Roll-Up Fishing Hole from the spare pocket Doraemon keeps in the closet to take her to the World Inside the Mirror. She reclaims Zanda Claus while getting Nobita to let her borrow the Roll-Up Fishing Hole for a while. 

After some time, Nobita is visibly nervous about what she is up to and, after seeing two shooting stars in a row, he uses the Bamboo Copter to investigate the forest at Mt. Ura. Nobita follows another shooting star through the unrolled Roll-Up Fishing Hole and finds Riruru building a massive robot army. Doraemon, having been suspicious of Nobita's peculiar behavior at home, follows him there. They enter the mirror world and see a massive base being built by humanoid robots. The duo then use a long-range Paper Cup Phone to listen in on Riruru as she orders the robots to work faster. She is revealed to be a human-hating robot. When Riruru discovers them, Nobita and Doraemon escape to their own world with the portal accidentally destroyed by Zanda Claus, but the two have completely forgotten about the sphere that is still at home, before it suddenly wakes out and bounces around. 

After Doraemon puts Translation Jelly, the sphere introduces itself as the 'brain' of Zanda Claus, while alerting him about a giant robot army that intends to conquer Earth and enslave all humanity. They try to alert the authorities but in vain as none of them believes Doraemon or Nobita. With only Suneo and Gian believing him and Nobita about the robot army, Doraemon pulls out a special incubator and puts the sphere with the Translation Jelly in it, causing it to hatch into a yellow chick that is named "Pippo" (one of the onomatopoeias to describe the sound a peep makes in Japanese). They reenter the Mirror World through Shizuka's Bathtub by using a special oil but leave Shizuka out of the mission due to its risky nature. 

Later, they are captured by the robot army with only Pippo and Nobita escaping. Nobita decides to help his friends and thus goes to the base to rescue them. At the base they see the robot army disposing of Zanda Claus whose actual name is revealed to be Judo. Pippo enters Zanda Claus and creates a distraction and Nobita rescues his friends. Meanwhile, Shizuka learns of the Mirror World and enters it. She finds an injured girl (Riruru) and takes her home. Later Nobita, Doraemon, Nobita, Suneo and Pippo rejoin with Shizuka. Shizuka uses Doraemon's machine first aid kit to repair Riruru. This helps the gang gain Pipo's trust Nobita becomes good friends with Pippo. 

Riruru had some traumatic experiences as a child, and she holds a very deep distrust and resentment towards humans. The only individual with whom she feels connected to is Pippo, whom she fixed "on a whim" after he was broken by the other robots. Despite everything Nobita and the others do for her, Riruru escape and decides to alert the rest of the Robot Army that they are in a Mirror World and not the real Earth. The gang locates her before the meet and Nobita tries to stop her but Riruru shoots Nobita with a laser beam from her finger. Pippo jumps in front of Nobita and becomes very badly injured, which gives Riruru a wake-up call as she decides to help the humans while not disclosing the reason for the lack of people. 

However, the commander and the rest of the robot army chain her up for her heresy and proceed to torture her for what she knows. Luckily, Nobita, Doraemon, and the others arrive with Zanda Claus and rescue her. Back in the real world, Riruru still feels conflicted as her willing allows Doraemon lock her up in a birdcage using the Small Light. Later, the robot army becomes suspicious because of the lack of humans in the world. They discover that they are in a fake world after analyzing the satellite image of the world and comparing the image to another image of the current world, and seeing how they are reversed. They return to the lake where they first entered the fake world, which they believe is the connection doorway. 

Doraemon and the group intercept the army at the lake. Riruru and Shizuka remain at Shizuka's house to have a talk, which gives Shizuka a brilliant idea to save the world. She re-enlarges Riruru, using the Enlarging Torch Light, and they both use the Walk-In Mirror to return to the real world. Using the time machine, they return to 30,000 years ago on Megatopia, attempting to talk to the professor who created the robots from which the robot army is descended. The professor plans to redo everything by removing the competition instinct from his robots, replacing those instincts with instincts of humanity and love. He collapses before he can finish his job. Riruru, in order to complete the salvation, disregards the fact that she and Pippo will disappear after they alter history, and she continues the reprogramming with instructions from the professor.

Back on Earth in the present time, the robot army, larger in number, has taken the upper hand. Zanda Claus is heavily damaged in the process of destroying the leading ship of the robot army. Riruru back at Megatopia, has nearly finished her job when the professor breathes his last. At first, she does not know what to do, then she figures out that she needs only to add her feelings, her love from Nobita and his friends, including Pippo. The job is completed just in time. The robot army is reinforced and attacks en masse. The reprogramming is successfully completed, and the robot army is completely erased, as are Riruru and Pippo. Shizuka uses the Anywhere Door to return to Earth, rejoining her friends with sorrow.

The next day, the group is back in the real world, and Nobita is back in school. This time, he chooses to stay, and Doraemon arrives to talk to him before going to the baseball field. While Nobita wonders if Riruru and Pippo may ever be resurrected, a shadow crosses his eyes and Riruru appears with wings on her back. The wings take the appearance of Pippo in the form of a giant Phoenix. They visit Nobita with cheers, then vanish once again into the air. Nobita believes it was Riruru and Pippo who appeared, and he runs to the field to tell his friends.

Cast

Characters 
 Zanda Claus — a robot with similarities to the Hyaku Shiki, from Yoshiyuki Tomino's Mobile Suit Zeta Gundam.
 Pippo — Zanda Claus' brain part, resembling a chick. He and Riruru change sides and help the humans. In the end, he is shown in the form of a giant bird. (did not appear in original 1986 movie)
Riruru — A mysterious gynoid built with the appearance of a teenage girl. She is sent as a spy by the soldiers of Mechatopia. She changes sides and helps the humans defeat the robot army. She and Pippo are later shown to be reborn. Her name is spelt as Lilulu (in original 1986 movie and subtitles), Riruru (in translation and audio) and Lillele (in Doko Demo Doa Manga Scanlation).

Catch Copy 
ひとつになれば、大きな力が目を覚ます。

Romanisation: Hitotsu ni Nareba, Ōkina Chikara ga Me wo Samasu.

English Translation: "When you combine your strength and fight together as one, the true power shall arise."

References

External links 
 
 
 

IMAX films
Japanese animated science fiction films
2010s Japanese-language films
2011 anime films
Nobita And The New Steel Troops: ~Winged Angels~
Anime film remakes
2010s science fiction films
Alien invasions in films
Films directed by Yukiyo Teramoto
2010s children's animated films
Japanese children's films